The Art of Walking is the fourth full-length album by Pere Ubu.  Mayo Thompson of The Red Krayola joined as guitarist for this album and slanted the proceedings further towards deconstruction and abstraction, and away from the primal rock that former guitarist Tom Herman had facilitated.  The group would record one more album with Thompson, Song of the Bailing Man, before disbanding.

An error in the first U.S. pressing resulted in a vocal overdub mix being used of "Arabia" - the original UK pressing used the correct instrumental mix. The first Rough Trade CD edition also used the accidental second mix, but the remastering on the Datapanik box set restored the correct version. The individual remastered disc issued subsequently included both (titling the vocal version "Arabian Nights"). Later editions of the album also changed the title of "Miles" to "Young Miles in the Basement." A version of the song "Horses" had originally appeared on Mayo Thompson's solo album Corky's Debt to His Father, in 1970.

Track listing
All songs written by Pere Ubu, except "Horses" (Mayo Thompson)
"Go"  – 3:34
"Rhapsody in Pink"  – 3:35
"Arabia"  – 4:58
"Young Miles in the Basement"  – 4:20
"Misery Goats"  – 2:37
"Loop"  – 3:14
"Rounder"  – 3:25
"Birdies"  – 2:27
"Lost in Art"  – 5:11
"Horses"  – 2:34
"Crush This Horn"  – 3:00

Personnel
Pere Ubu
David Thomas – lead vocals (1-5, 7–9, 11), Vox Continental Baroque organ, drums (9)
Mayo Thompson – guitar, backing and lead (6, 10) vocals, piano
Allen Ravenstine – EML synthesizers
Tony Maimone – bass, piano, organ
Scott Krauss – drums (all but 9), horn, piano, drum machine
Technical
Paul Hamann - engineer
John Thompson - cover design

References

Pere Ubu albums
1980 albums
Rough Trade Records albums
Cooking Vinyl albums
Fire Records (UK) albums